The 2015 Harvard Crimson football team represented Harvard University during the 2015 NCAA Division I FCS football season. They were led by 22nd-year head coach Tim Murphy and played their home games at Harvard Stadium. They were a member of the Ivy League. They finished the season 9–1 overall 6–1 in Ivy League play to place in a three-way tie for the Ivy League title with Dartmouth and Penn. Harvard averaged 12,798 fans per game.

Schedule

Ranking movements

References

Harvard
Harvard Crimson football seasons
Ivy League football champion seasons
Harvard Crimson football
Harvard Crimson football